The 1934–35 Chicago Black Hawks season was the team's ninth season in the NHL. The Hawks qualified for the playoffs, but lost to the Montreal Maroons in the semi-finals.

Offseason
The Black Hawks were coming off a Stanley Cup championship, as the Hawks defeated the Detroit Red Wings in the 1934 Stanley Cup Finals to win their first ever championship. The celebration was short lived though, as goaltender Chuck Gardiner would pass away on June 13, 1934, due to a brain hemorrhage.

In the off-season, the Black Hawks and Montreal Canadiens would make a huge trade, as the Canadiens sent Lorne Chabot, Howie Morenz and Marty Burke to the Hawks in exchange for Lionel Conacher, Roger Jenkins and LeRoy Goldsworthy.

Regular season
The Hawks would rebound, as they would set a team record with 57 points, along with 26 wins, to finish in 2nd place in the American Division, just 1 point behind the Boston Bruins.  Chicago would score 118 goals, which placed them 6th in the 9 team NHL, while they would allow a league low 88 goals. Morenz would help the Black Hawks offensively, recording a team record and career high 26 assists, while Johnny Gottselig would score a club high 19 goals. Paul Thompson would lead the team with 39 points, scoring 16 goals and adding 23 assists. Defenseman Arthur Coulter would lead the team with 68 penalty minutes, and lead all defensemen with 12 points. In goal, Lorne Chabot would win the Vezina Trophy, as the Hawks allowed the fewest goals in the NHL.  Chabot would post a 1.88 GAA, and win a club record 26 games.

Final standings

Record vs. opponents

Schedule and results

Playoffs
The Black Hawks would face the Montreal Maroons in the opening round of the playoffs in their quest for their second-straight Stanley Cup, as the teams faced off in a two-game, total goals series.  The teams would play to a 0–0 draw in the opening game in Montreal, then in the 2nd game in Chicago, the series would come to an end as the Maroons surprised the Black Hawks with a 1–0 OT victory, drawing an end to the Hawks season.

Montreal Maroons 1, Chicago Black Hawks 0

Player statistics

Scoring leaders

Goaltending

Playoff stats

Scoring leaders

Goaltending

References

SHRP Sports
The Internet Hockey Database
National Hockey League Guide & Record Book 2007

Chicago Blackhawks seasons
Chicago
Chicago